The Hollywood Casino 400 is a  NASCAR Cup Series stock car race held at Kansas Speedway in Kansas City, Kansas. This race is the second of ten races in the Cup Series playoffs; since 2022, it is the second race of the Round of 16.

NBC has the rights for the final 20 races of the season (16 of 20), which includes the Hollywood Casino 400. Bubba Wallace is the defending winner of the race.

Past winners

Notes
2007: The race was shortened due to darkness after two rain delays.
2011, 2015, and 2019: Races extended due to NASCAR overtime.
2012: First race on new configuration.

Multiple winners (drivers)

Multiple winners (teams)

Manufacturer wins

References

External links
 

2001 establishments in Kansas
NASCAR races at Kansas Speedway
NASCAR Cup Series races
Recurring sporting events established in 2001
Annual sporting events in the United States